Educational Management Administration & Leadership is a bimonthly peer-reviewed academic journal that covers the field of management in education. The editor-in-chief is Tony Bush of the University of Nottingham. It was established in 1972 and is published by SAGE Publications on behalf of the British Educational Leadership, Management & Administration Society.

Abstracting and indexing 
The journal is abstracted and indexed in Academic Premier, Current Contents/Social and Behavioral Sciences, Social Sciences Citation Index, and Scopus. According to the Journal Citation Reports, the journal has a 2013 impact factor of 0.405.

References

External links 
 

SAGE Publishing academic journals
English-language journals
Education journals
Business and management journals
Bimonthly journals
Publications established in 1972